UFC 53: Heavy Hitters was a mixed martial arts event held by the Ultimate Fighting Championship on June 4, 2005, at the Boardwalk Hall in Atlantic City, New Jersey. The event was broadcast live on pay-per-view in the United States, and later released on DVD.

History

This event was originally scheduled to take place at the Yokohama Arena in Japan with an Interim Heavyweight Championship bout between Andrei Arlovski and Mirko Filipović serving as the main event. However the lack of sponsorship for the event forced the event to be moved to Atlantic City.

Initially, former champion Ricco Rodriguez was slated to contend for the Heavyweight Championship, but withdrew from the bout, citing complications with his training camp.  Headlining the card opposite of Interim Heavyweight Champion Arlovski, instead, was Miletich protégé Justin Eilers. Although there was some criticism directed at the UFC for giving Eilers a title shot after coming off a knockout loss to Paul Buentello at UFC 51, the UFC explained that Buentello was not medically cleared to fight when the main event was originally scheduled.

This was Forrest Griffin's first fight after winning The Ultimate Fighter show.

Results

See also 
 Ultimate Fighting Championship
 List of UFC champions
 List of UFC events
 2005 in UFC

Sources
UFC 53: Heavy Hitters Results on Sherdog.com
"Ultimate Fighting Championship Cards" on Wrestling Information Archives

References 

Ultimate Fighting Championship events
2005 in mixed martial arts
Mixed martial arts in New Jersey
Sports competitions in Atlantic City, New Jersey
2005 in sports in New Jersey